Satyabhijna Tirtha was a Hindu philosopher, scholar and saint. He served as the pontiff of Shri Uttaradi Math from 14 April 1945 – 2 February 1948. He was the 40th in succession from Madhvacharya.

References

Bibliography
 

 

Madhva religious leaders
Vaishnavism
Uttaradi Math
Dvaitin philosophers
Bhakti movement
Hindu activists
Dvaita Vedanta